Rovo is a Japanese instrumental band founded in 1996 in Tokyo by guitarist Seiichi Yamamoto (Boredoms), electric violinist Yuji Katsui (Bondage Fruit), and synthesizer/effects technician Tatsuki Masuko, and featuring Yasuhiro Yoshigaki on drums and percussion, Youichi Okabe on drums and percussion, and Jin Harada on bass guitar. Rovo defines their music as "man-drive trance," and many of their compositions have a repetitive minimalism, blended with progressive rock and psychedelic music, related to the style of bands such as Gong, Neu!, and Simple Minds (circa 1981). They collaborated with Gong guitarist (and former Simple Minds producer) Steve Hillage's group System 7 on the 2013 album "Phoenix Rising".

Discography
Pico! (1998), Sony Music Entertainment
Imago (1999), Sony Music Entertainment
Pyramid (2000), Sony Music Entertainment
Sai (2001), Hi-Fidelity Flag Disc/Warner Indies Network
Sino / Pan-American Beef Stake Art Federations split 12" with Date Course Pentagon Royal Garden (2001), P-Vine Records
Tonic 2001 live double album (2002), Tzadik Records
Flage (2002), Hi-Fidelity Flag Disc/Warner Indies Network
Mon (2004), Hi-Fidelity Flag Disc/First Aid Network
Condor (2006), Wonderground Music
Nuou (2008), Wonderground Music
Ravo (2010), Wonderground Music
Phase (2012)
Phoenix Rising (2013) with System 7, a-wave
XI (2016), Wonderground Music

External links
 Official website

Japanese rock music groups
Tzadik Records artists